Ashpaz Khaneh Zahhak Castle is a historical castle located in Fasa County in Fars Province, The fortress dates back to the Parthian Empire and Sasanian Empire.

References 

Castles in Iran
Sasanian castles
Parthian castles